WFRD (99.3 MHz "99 Rock") is a commercial FM radio station licensed to Hanover, New Hampshire. Owned and operated by Dartmouth Broadcasting, the WFRD studios are located on the Hanover campus of Dartmouth College.  The station transmitter is located off Crafts Hill Road in Lebanon, New Hampshire.  WFRD airs a mainstream rock radio format with some alternative rock and classic rock tracks.

In addition to a standard analog transmission, WFRD is available online via iHeartRadio and from its website.

Programming
The station's playlist on weekdays is mostly mainstream rock, plus alternative rock and classic rock titles. Weekday mornings feature Chris Garrett and the "Rock N Go Morning Show." The station's middays, afternoons, nights and weekends feature DJs who are students at Dartmouth College. The station also provides hourly news and sports reports in morning drive time.  In addition, special on air features include "The Happy Hour," which features listener requests. On weeknights, WFRD features alternative rock, active rock, and classic rock plus the "99 Minute Nightmare," which features programming geared more towards heavy metal. Monday through Friday, 99Rock airs "Loudwire Nights" hosted by Toni Gonzalez.

On weekends, WFRD focuses on specific genres of rock music or its roots, and on public affairs or sports. "Valley Voices" is a 30-minute public affairs show that showcases various local events and news stories that airs Sunday mornings. "The Big Green Scene," airs Sunday mornings and concentrates on Dartmouth Sports, with highlights, recaps, interviews with coaches, and more.

Weekends include several syndicated programs including Harddrive with Lou Brutus, Rock Countdown with LA Lloyd, Skratch 'N Sniff, The House of Hair with Dee Snider, Out of Order with Stryker, Racing Rocks with Riki Rachtman, and Full Metal Jackie.  On Sunday nights, WFRD also features a two-hour show called "Homebrew," spotlighting local artists from around the region.  Local acts are encouraged to submit their material for airplay.  The show also features in-studio interviews with local bands.

Organization
WFRD is a commercial radio station, operated and managed by Dartmouth Broadcasting, which is in turn owned by the Trustees of Dartmouth College. WFRD receives no funding from the college.  It supports itself by selling advertising. Student staff members are, for the most part, unpaid. (Some are paid a stipend to help operate the station during the summer and other times when Dartmouth classes are not in session.) The station is managed by a board composed of current students. It acts as a training ground for students interested in broadcasting, and is a serious commercial competitor in the Lebanon-Hanover-White River Junction radio market.

WFRD is involved in the Hanover and Upper Valley community. The station features a "Community Calendar" segment, where non-profit organizations can send bulletins of their events to be read over the air. WFRD also does remote broadcasts from charity events and local businesses around the Upper Valley, and participates in local charitable and cultural events.

History
WFRD's history goes back more than four decades.  On February 19, 1976, WFRD first signed on the air.  It originally broadcast a wide variety of music, from classical, jazz, folk music to progressive rock, punk rock and new wave music.  The call letters stand for "FM Radio Dartmouth", referring to Dartmouth College.  There was a lengthy debate over whether to choose WDCR-FM to link the FM station with its former AM companion, 1340 WDCR (now defunct), or to give the new FM station an independent identity. Among the arguments for an independent identity was the possibility of selling the AM station once FM became the more popular broadcast band.

Around 2001, WFRD began playing a modern rock format, although by the 2010s, WFRD began including other genres of current rock.  In 2011, WFRD celebrated its 35th Anniversary by playing "35 Years of Rock," spotlighting songs from 1976 to the present.  As of 2014, the station left the Nielsen BDS Alternative Rock indicator panel and was added to the Nielsen BDS Mainstream Rock indicator panel.  In 2016, WFRD celebrated its 40th Anniversary with the slogan "40 Years of Rock."

In June 2021 Dartmouth Broadcasting announced plans to sell the station, citing ongoing unprofitability and low student involvement in its operations as deciding factors. The online station WDCR and Dartmouth Broadcasting itself are not part of the planned sale. On October 13, 2021, Sugar River Media, owner of several other stations in the Lebanon-Hanover-White River Junction area (including WNTK-FM and WUVR), announced its acquisition of WFRD.

Notable alumni
Eric Wellman '91, current program director at WAXQ ("Q104.3") in New York City
Eric MacDonald '04, former program director at WCTZ ("96.7 The Coast") in Norwalk, Connecticut (now WARW)

See also
Dartmouth Broadcasting

Further reading

Brooks, Tim, College Radio Days: 70 Years of Student Broadcasting at Dartmouth College, Greenwich CT: Glenville Press, 2014.

References

External links
99Rock WFRD official website
99Rock on Facebook
Rock and Go Morning Show on Facebook

FRD
Modern rock radio stations in the United States
Radio stations established in 1976
Hanover, New Hampshire
Dartmouth College
1976 establishments in New Hampshire